is a passenger railway station in located in the city of  Fukuchiyama, Kyoto Prefecture, Japan, operated by the private railway company Willer Trains (Kyoto Tango Railway).

Lines

Station layout
The station consists of one group level island platform, connected to the road by a level crossing. The station is unattended. There is no station building except for a shelter on the platform.

Adjacent stations

History
The station was opened on 16 July 1988.

Passenger statistics
In fiscal 2018, the station was used by an average of 8 passengers daily.

Surrounding area
Kotai-Jinja

See also
List of railway stations in Japan

References

External links

Official home page 

Railway stations in Kyoto Prefecture
Railway stations in Japan opened in 1988
Fukuchiyama, Kyoto